Duncan McLeod may refer to:
 Duncan Lloyd McLeod (1874–1935), politician in Manitoba, Canada
 Duncan Stuart McLeod (1854–1933), politician in Manitoba, Canada

See also
 Duncan MacLeod, a fictional character from the Highlander multiverse
 Duncan MacLeod (footballer) (born 1949), Scottish footballer